Senggi, or Viid, is a Papuan language of Indonesian Papua. It is spoken in Senggi village, Senggi District, Keerom Regency.

References

Galis, Klaas Wilhelm. 1956. Etnographische notities over het Senggi-gebied. Gouvernement van Nederlands Nieuw-Guinea, Kantoor voor Bevolkingszaken. 34pp. (No. 86).

Border languages (New Guinea)
Languages of western New Guinea